The 2007 Prime Minister's Cup was the fourth national football cup competition in Laos. The competition was won by MPWT FC (Ministry of Public Works and Transport), who beat Savannakhet FC 2-1 in the final.

Format
The top four teams from the 2004 Lao League were joined by four provincial teams from outside Vientiane. These eight teams were split into two groups and a round robin series of matches was played. The top two teams from each group qualified for the semi final knockout round to determine the two teams that would contest the final. The losers of the semi finals met in a third place playoff. It is not clear whether there was a qualifying tournament for the provincial teams as there was in 2004 and 2006.

Group stage
The four regional teams Savannakhet FC, Champasak FC, Oudomxay FC and Luang Prabang FC were drawn alongside the top four teams from the 2004 Lao League: Lao-American College FC, Banks FC, Vientiane FC and MPWT FC (Ministry of Public Works and Transportation).

Group A

Results

Round 1

Round 2

Round 3

Group B

Results

Round 1

Round 2

Round 3

Semi-finals

Third place playoff

Final

References

2007 domestic association football cups
Football competitions in Laos
Lao Premier League
Prime Minister's Cup